Heating Plant may refer to:

Heating plant, a mechanism
Heating Plant (Bowling Green, Kentucky), listed on the National Register of Historic Places in Warren County, Kentucky
Heating Plant (Silver City, New Mexico), listed on the National Register of Historic Places in Grant County, New Mexico